Rasca and similar may refer to:

Geography

Romania
 Râșca, Cluj, a commune in Cluj County
 Râșca, Suceava, a commune in Suceava County
 Râșca, a village in Drăgănești Commune, Neamț County
 Râșca, a village in Gura Caliței Commune, Vrancea County
 Râșca, a village in Moldovița Commune, Suceava County
 Râșca, a village in Ripiceni Commune, Botoșani County
 Râșca Mare, a tributary of the Someșul Rece in Cluj County
 Râșca (Moldova), a tributary of the Moldova in Suceava County
 Râșca (Neamț), a tributary of the Moldova in Neamț County
 Râșca (Someș), a tributary of the Someșul Cald in Cluj County

People 
 Rasca (footballer), the nickname of Angolan footballer Maieco Domingos Henrique António

See also 
 Rășcani (disambiguation)
 Rîșcani